Scent Dance I ( 香之舞 I ) is a work
for solo clarinet, composed by He Xuntian in 2009.

Summary
Scent Dance I was commissioned for the 2009 2nd Beijing International Music 
Competition – Clarinet Competition and included in the list of required repertoire.

Inspiration
Scent Dance I was inspired from Xuntian He’s poem Passing By the Earth (1999).

References

External links
Scent Dance I published by Schott Musik International, Germany

Compositions by He Xuntian
Solo clarinet pieces
2009 compositions